Mokhtaran (also Romanized as Mokhtārān, Moxtārān, and Mukhtārān) is a village in Naharjan Rural District, Mud District, Sarbisheh County, South Khorasan Province, Iran. At the 2006 census, its population was 804, in 212 families.

References 

Populated places in Sarbisheh County